Angler is a fishing video game written by Dirk Olivier for the ZX Spectrum and published 1983  by Virgin Games. The player controls a boat along the top of the screen and has 100 casts to catch as many fish as possible.

Plot
Taken from the game's instructions:

References

External links

1983 video games
Europe-exclusive video games
Fishing video games
Video games developed in the United Kingdom
ZX Spectrum games
ZX Spectrum-only games